ChipMixer was a cryptocurrency laundering service operated out of Vietnam from servers run in Germany. The service was allegedly used to launder more than three billion dollars over a period of six years.

Service 
The service allowed customers to obfuscate the origin of cryptocurrency transactions. This anonymization was useful for criminals who used the service when purchasing illicit goods from darknet markets. Additionally, criminals needing to hide the origins of ransomware payouts used the site.

Seizure 
The website and backend servers were seized by the (Bundespolizei), (Federal Bureau of Investigation, Homeland Security Investigations, and Europol on March 15, 2023. The German police seized 46 million dollars in cryptocurrency.

References 

Cryptocurrency tumblers
Cybercrime
Defunct websites